Braybrook College is a state secondary college located in the suburb of Braybrook which is located in Melbourne's western suburbs.

About the school
Braybrook College is a Year 7-12, Single campus, co-educational, multicultural, Years 7 to 12 college, largely serving the areas of Sunshine and Footscray.

The school is well-resourced with facilities including Computer Labs, Numeracy Centre, Music Centre, Drama Centre, Gymnasium, Library, Careers Centre, Food/Home Economics Centre, Woodwork Centre and Machine Workshop, Ceramics and Arts Studios, Science Laboratories, Canteen, Synthetic Soccer Pitch, Landscaped gardens, and a covered BBQ area.

The school also has a range of special programs, including an International Students Program, a Program for Students with a Disability, an EAL Program, a "Student at Risk" Program, a Literacy Program, a STEM Program, a Peer Support Program and a Program for High Achievers' (SEEK).

History
The school was founded as Braybrook High School, then changed its name from Braybrook Secondary College to Braybrook College.

Achievements
Braybrook College graduate Linh Do, defeated seven other nominees from across the state to win the 2008 VCE Achiever of the Year Award, which honors student community contributions. The 18-year-old  attended Kevin Rudd’s 2020 Youth Summit and Al Gore’s climate-change leadership training, and then started her own climate change organisation.

References

External links
School Website

Public high schools in Victoria (Australia)
Educational institutions established in 1960
1960 establishments in Australia
Buildings and structures in the City of Maribyrnong
.